Tristicha is a genus of flowering plants belonging to the family Podostemaceae.

Its native range is Tropical Asia, Africa, South America and North America.

Species:
 Tristicha trifaria (Bory ex Willd.) Spreng.

References

Podostemaceae
Malpighiales genera